Grace Like Rain is the first record-label released album by Contemporary Christian songwriter Todd Agnew, and was released on October 7, 2003 by Ardent Records. This album features the hit songs "Grace Like Rain" and "This Fragile Breath".

Track listing 
All songs written by Todd Agnew, except where noted. 

"Reached Down" – 2:49
"This Fragile Breath (The Thunder Song)" – 4:11
"Shepherd" – 3:37
"Grace Like Rain" (Agnew, Chris Collins, John Newton, E. O. Excell) – 4:22
"Romans 12:1" – 3:44
"Still Here Waiting" – 3:54
"Come Ye Sinners" (Joseph Hart) – 5:01
"You Are" – 4:38
"Kindness" (Chris Tomlin, Jesse Reeves, Louie Giglio) – 4:41
"Lay It Down" – 4:31
"Only One Thing" (Agnew, Collins, Martin Smith) – 4:03
Wait For Your Rain – 15:07
"Grace Like Rain" (Rock Version) (Bonus Track) – 4:21
"Savior Like a Shepherd" (Bonus Track) (William B. Bradbury, Dorothy Ann Thrupp) – 4:07

Production 
 Jason Latshaw – producer, engineer
 Matt Martone – additional engineer
 John Hampton – mixing
 Leo Goff – mix assistant
 Brad Blackwood – mastering
 SPEAK! Communications – cover design 
 Joshua Horton – design layout 
 Ben Pearson – photography 
 VanLiere-Wilcox – management

Musicians 
 Todd Agnew – lead vocals, acoustic guitar, arrangements (9)
 Rick Steff – Hammond B3 organ (1, 5, 7, 10, 11), Rhodes piano (3), accordion (3), acoustic piano (5, 12), Wurlitzer electric piano (11), keyboards (12, 14)
 Ross Rice – acoustic piano (6, 9), Hammond B3 organ (9)
 Jack Holder – electric guitar (1, 5, 7, 9, 10, 12), baritone guitar (3)
 Steve Selvidge – electric guitar (2, 4, 6, 8, 11-14), 12-string electric guitar (8), lap steel guitar (8)
 Michael Anderson – "gospel" electric guitar (10)
 Justin Rimer – electric guitar (13)
 Dave Smith – bass
 Kim Trammell – drums
 Jason Latshaw – percussion
 Richard Thomas – cello (2, 4, 11, 13)
 Amanda Martin – cello (6)
 Rebecca Kletzker – viola (2)
 Shannon Kelly – viola (13)
 Jonathan Chu – violin (1, 2, 8, 11)
 Anna Acosta – violin (2, 4, 13), all violins (6)
 Robbie Seay – music and arrangements (7)
 Shara Worden – backing vocals (1), guest vocals (9)
 Bruce Clinton – backing vocals (2)
 Dena Parker – backing vocals (3, 12)
 Kevin Paige – backing vocals (4, 13), guest vocals (11)
 Todd Hale – backing vocals (5)
 Anabeth Lacher – backing vocals (8, 11)
 Bertram Brown – choir vocals (10)
 William Brown – choir vocals (10)
 Susan Marshall – choir vocals (10), guest vocals (10)
 Jackie Reddick – choir vocals (10)
 David Lewis – backing vocals (11)

External links
 Todd Agnew's Website

References

2003 debut albums
Todd Agnew albums
Ardent Records albums